Felipe Jaramillo Velásquez (born 18 April 1996) is a Colombian footballer who plays as a midfielder for Categoría Primera A side Águilas Doradas.

Career
In his early life, he was in the Atlético Nacional Youth Team from 2010 to 2015. After, he went to Argentina and was in the youth teams of both Gimnasia y Esgrima (LP) and Defensores de Cambaceres. Back in Colombia, on 2017 he began his professional career after joining Itagüí Leones in the Categoría Primera B, becoming the team captain and getting the promotion to the Categoría Primera A. After the relegation of Itagüí Leones, on 2019 he was loaned to Millonarios and to América de Cali on 2020, playing at the 2020 Copa Libertadores and winning the 2020 Categoría Primera A.

On 2021, he moved on loan to Deportes La Serena in the Chilean Primera División.

Honours
Millonarios
 Torneo Fox Sports (1): 2019

América de Cali
 Categoría Primera A (1): 2020
 Torneo ESPN (1): 2020

References

External links

Felipe Jaramillo at playmakerstats.com (English version of ceroacero.es)

1996 births
Living people
Footballers from Medellín
Colombian footballers
Leones F.C. footballers
Millonarios F.C. players
América de Cali footballers
Deportes La Serena footballers
Águilas Doradas Rionegro players
Categoría Primera B players
Categoría Primera A players
Chilean Primera División players
Association football midfielders
Colombian expatriate footballers
Colombian expatriate sportspeople in Argentina
Expatriate footballers in Argentina
Colombian expatriate sportspeople in Chile
Expatriate footballers in Chile